Cholmeley Lodge is an Art Deco / Streamline Moderne grade II listed residential building in Highgate, London, designed by architect Guy Morgan.

Built in 1934 and taking its name from Sir Roger Cholmeley, (pronounced 'Chumlee') who owned the land until 1565, it is a curving six-storey block of 48 flats, with an unusual three curved concave blocks spanning a 30-foot radius.

It would later inspire the design of another, more famous apartment block built by Guy Morgan in London: Florin Court.

Cholmeley Lodge was originally proposed and planned to be built on Bournemouth seafront, but the local council did not approve the modern design, requiring some Tudor-style timberwork to soften the elevation.

Being thus refused, the project was moved to the London Borough of Haringey and built facing Highgate Hill by replacing the demolished Mermaid Inn.

See also
Florin Court
Du Cane Court
Trinity Court, Gray’s Inn Road

References

Art Deco architecture in London
Buildings and structures completed in 1934
Residential buildings in London
Streamline Moderne architecture
Streamline Moderne architecture in the United Kingdom
1934 establishments in England
Grade II listed residential buildings
Grade II listed houses in London
Grade II listed buildings in the London Borough of Haringey
Highgate